In the mathematical field of differential geometry, a smooth map between Riemannian manifolds is called harmonic if its coordinate representatives satisfy a certain nonlinear partial differential equation. This partial differential equation for a mapping also arises as the Euler-Lagrange equation of a functional called the Dirichlet energy. As such, the theory of harmonic maps contains both the theory of unit-speed geodesics in Riemannian geometry and the theory of harmonic functions.

For instance, an unstretched rubber band and a smooth stone can both be naturally viewed as Riemannian manifolds. Any way of stretching the rubber band over the stone can be viewed as a mapping between these manifolds, and the total tension involved is represented by the Dirichlet energy. Harmonicity of such a mapping means that, given any hypothetical way of physically deforming the given stretch, the tension (when considered as a function of time) has first derivative equal to zero when the deformation begins.

The theory of harmonic maps was initiated in 1964 by James Eells and Joseph Sampson, who showed that in certain geometric contexts, arbitrary maps could be deformed into harmonic maps. Their work was the inspiration for Richard Hamilton's initial work on the Ricci flow. Harmonic maps and the associated harmonic map heat flow, in and of themselves, are among the most widely studied topics in the field of geometric analysis.

The discovery of the "bubbling" of sequences of harmonic maps, due to Jonathan Sacks and Karen Uhlenbeck, has been particularly influential, as their analysis has been adapted to many other geometric contexts. Notably, Uhlenbeck's parallel discovery of bubbling of Yang–Mills fields is important in Simon Donaldson's work on four-dimensional manifolds, and Mikhael Gromov's later discovery of bubbling of pseudoholomorphic curves is significant in applications to symplectic geometry and quantum cohomology. The techniques used by Richard Schoen and Uhlenbeck to study the regularity theory of harmonic maps have likewise been the inspiration for the development of many analytic methods in geometric analysis.

Geometry of mappings between manifolds 
Here the geometry of a smooth mapping between Riemannian manifolds is considered via local coordinates and, equivalently, via linear algebra. Such a mapping defines both a first fundamental form and second fundamental form. The Laplacian (also called tension field) is defined via the second fundamental form, and its vanishing is the condition for the map to be harmonic. The definitions extend without modification to the setting of pseudo-Riemannian manifolds.

Local coordinates

Bundle formalism
Let  and  be Riemannian manifolds.

By the definition of the trace operator, the laplacian may be written as

Dirichlet energy and its variation formulas
From the perspective of local coordinates, as given above, the energy density of a mapping  is the real-valued function on  given by

It is also possible to consider the energy density as being given by (half of) the -trace of the first fundamental form.

Since any nonnegative measurable function has a well-defined Lebesgue integral, it is not necessary to place the restriction that  is compact; however, then the Dirichlet energy could be infinite.

The variation formulas for the Dirichlet energy compute the derivatives of the Dirichlet energy  as the mapping  is deformed.
 The first variation formula says that

There is also a version for manifolds with boundary.
 There is also a second variation formula.
Due to the first variation formula, the Laplacian of  can be thought of as the gradient of the Dirichlet energy; correspondingly, a harmonic map is a critical point of the Dirichlet energy. This can be done formally in the language of global analysis and Banach manifolds.

Examples of harmonic maps
Let  and  be smooth Riemannian manifolds. The notation  is used to refer to the standard Riemannian metric on Euclidean space.
 Every totally geodesic map  is harmonic; this follows directly from the above definitions. As special cases:
 The identity map  is harmonic.
As a special case:
 If  is a constant-speed immersion, then  is harmonic if and only if  solves the geodesic differential equation.
 A smooth map  is harmonic if and only if each of its  component functions are harmonic as maps . This coincides with the notion of harmonicity provided by the Laplace-Beltrami operator.
 Every holomorphic map between Kähler manifolds is harmonic.
 Every harmonic morphism between Riemannian manifolds is harmonic.

Harmonic map heat flow

Well-posedness
Let  and  be smooth Riemannian manifolds. This is usually abbreviated as:

Eells and Sampson introduced the harmonic map heat flow and proved the following fundamental properties:
 Regularity.
 Existence.
 Uniqueness.
As a consequence of the uniqueness theorem, there exists a maximal harmonic map heat flow with initial data , meaning that one has a harmonic map heat flow  as in the statement of the existence theorem, and it is uniquely defined under the extra criterion that  takes on its maximal possible value, which could be infinite.

Eells and Sampson's theorem
The primary result of Eells and Sampson's 1964 paper is the following:

The very existence of a harmonic map in each homotopy class, which is implicitly being asserted, is part of the result. Shortly after Eells and Sampson's work, Philip Hartman extended their methods to study uniqueness of harmonic maps within homotopy classes, additionally showing that the convergence in the Eells−Sampson theorem is strong, without the need to select a subsequence. Eells and Sampson's result was adapted by Richard Hamilton to the setting of the Dirichlet boundary value problem, when  is instead compact with nonempty boundary.

Singularities and weak solutions
Following the work of Kung-Ching Chang, Wei-Yue Ding, and Rugang Ye in 1992, it is widely accepted that the maximal time of existence of a harmonic map heat flow cannot "usually" be expected to be infinite. Since elliptic and parabolic partial differential equations are particularly smooth when the domain is two dimensions, the Chang−Ding−Ye result is considered to be indicative of the general character of the flow.

In the case that  is two-dimensional, he established the unconditional existence and uniqueness for weak solutions of the harmonic map heat flow. Moreover, he found that his weak solutions are smooth away from finitely many spacetime points at which the energy density concentrates. On microscopic levels, the flow near these points is modeled by a bubble, i.e. a smooth harmonic map from the round 2-sphere into the target. Weiyue Ding and Gang Tian were able to prove the energy quantization at singular times, meaning that the Dirichlet energy of Struwe's weak solution, at a singular time, drops by exactly the sum of the total Dirichlet energies of the bubbles corresponding to singularities at that time.

Struwe was later able to adapt his methods to higher dimensions, in the case that the domain manifold is Euclidean space; he and Yun Mei Chen also considered higher-dimensional closed manifolds. Their results achieved less than in low dimensions, only being able to prove existence of weak solutions which are smooth on open dense subsets.

The Bochner formula and rigidity
The main computational point in the proof of Eells and Sampson's theorem is an adaptation of the Bochner formula to the setting of a harmonic map heat flow . This formula says

This is also of interest in analyzing harmonic maps. Suppose  is harmonic; any harmonic map can be viewed as a constant-in- solution of the harmonic map heat flow, and so one gets from the above formula that

Richard Schoen and Shing-Tung Yau noted that this reasoning can be extended to noncompact  by making use of Yau's theorem asserting that nonnegative subharmonic functions which are -bounded must be constant. In summary, according to these results, one has:

The general idea of deforming a general map to a harmonic map, and then showing that any such harmonic map must automatically be of a highly restricted class, has found many applications. For instance, Yum-Tong Siu found an important complex-analytic version of the Bochner formula, asserting that a harmonic map between Kähler manifolds must be holomorphic, provided that the target manifold has appropriately negative curvature. By an alternative formulation of the same approach, Siu was able to prove a variant of the still-unsolved Hodge conjecture, albeit in the restricted context of negative curvature.

Kevin Corlette found a significant extension of Siu's Bochner formula, and used it to prove new rigidity theorems for lattices in certain Lie groups. Following this, Mikhael Gromov and Richard Schoen extended much of the theory of harmonic maps to allow  to be replaced by a metric space. By an extension of the Eells−Sampson theorem together with an extension of the Siu–Corlette Bochner formula, they were able to prove new rigidity theorems for lattices.

Problems and applications 

 Existence results on harmonic maps between manifolds has consequences for their curvature.
 Once existence is known, how can a harmonic map be constructed explicitly? (One fruitful method uses twistor theory.)
 In theoretical physics, a quantum field theory whose action is given by the Dirichlet energy is known as a sigma model. In such a theory, harmonic maps correspond to instantons.
 One of the original ideas in grid generation methods for computational fluid dynamics and computational physics was to use either conformal or harmonic mapping to generate regular grids.

Harmonic maps between metric spaces
The energy integral can be formulated in a weaker setting for functions  between two metric spaces.  The energy integrand is instead a function of the form

in which μ is a family of measures attached to each point of M.

See also
Geometric flow

References

Footnotes

Articles

Books and surveys

 Consists of reprints of:

External links 
 MathWorld: Harmonic map
 Harmonic Maps Bibliography
 The Bibliography of Harmonic Morphisms

Riemannian geometry
Harmonic functions
Analytic functions